The 2006 Utah Utes football team represented the University of Utah in the 2006 NCAA Division I FBS football season. The team was coached by 2nd year head football coach Kyle Whittingham. The Utes played their homes games in Rice-Eccles Stadium.

Schedule

After the season

NFL Draft
Utah had two players taken in the 2007 NFL Draft:

References

Utah
Utah Utes football seasons
Armed Forces Bowl champion seasons
Utah Utes football